The Devil Makes Work for Idle Hands is a greatest hits album released by the New Zealand band Head Like A Hole in 2009 in support of their 2009 reunion tour.

Track listing
Chalkface
Comfortably Shagged
Mr Bastard
Fish Across Face
Sleazebadge
Faster Hooves
Cornbag
Chevrolet
Nevermind Today
Maharajah
I'm On Fire
Doctors And Nurses
Top Heavy
Wallow
Spanish Goat Dancer
Keith
Crying Shame
Wet Rubber
Hootenanny
Air
Velvet Kushion

References 

2000 greatest hits albums
HLAH albums